Charles O'Tudor (born 20 June 1971) is a Nigerian brand strategist, public speaker, and businessman. He is the principal consultant of ADSTRAT Branding Management Consortium.

Educational background
O'Tudor was raised in Cross River State, Nigeria. He received his primary education at Command Children School in Lagos State, and his secondary education at Command Secondary School, Ikeja, Lagos State where he bagged his West African School Certificate, (WASC) in 1987. He holds a bachelor's degree in Sociology from the University of Jos and is an alumnus of the University of Witwatersrand, Johannesburg, South Africa, where he received Certificates in Management and Measuring Organizational Strategies, Product Strategy and Brand Management. He is an Associate Member of the Advertising Practitioners Council of Nigeria (APCON) and an Associate Member, Nigerian Institute of Public Relations (NIPR).

Career

O’Tudor began his career in advertising and branding at Shops Bankole Sagie Advertising, where he worked for three years as advert executive. O'Tudor went on to become Deputy Manager at Explicit Communications, where he managed Multinational Accounts. He then went on to become Client Services Manager at Solutions. In 2001, he founded ADSTRAT BMC, of which he has been Principal Consultant till date.

Adstract has handled accounts of brands spanning the construction, aviation, fashion, telecommunications, banking, furniture, entertainment, education, hospitality and pharmaceutical industries. The firm, with two affiliates (Axle and Stratis) has crafted phrases and words like, Cerebral Filtration Processes, Processed thought to Finish, O2ygenation, Re-O2ygenation and O2yculturation as the terminologies employed its day-to-day branding activities.

O'Tudor was appointed anchor of the Bank PHB-sponsored show, the Intern TV Show, the first ever business reality TV show in Nigeria.

Initiatives and public discourses

O'Tudor founded BrandsArise, "a social emancipation initiative anchored on the philosophy that when individuals rise, their communities will rise and ultimately the nation will rise". The programme is targeted at creating an awareness for youths to become strong, formidable, and positive brands that extol values such as integrity, honour, enterprise, and patriotism. It is about translating an unknown brand into a successful brand. BrandsArise has been hosted in several locations in [Nigeria]. BrandsArise made its debut as a series of articles published in BusinessDay over a period of time.

As a public speaker, commentator and role model, O'Tudor has attended public functions where he gave lectures on branding. O'Tudor's critical standpoint on "Rebranding Nigeria Campaign" (an initiative under Professor Dora Akunyili-led Ministry of Information and Communications), was captured in his article titled 'Rebranding Nigeria: Myths and Realities.’ His commentaries have been cited by authors and made as reference points in socio-economic discourses.

Accomplishments and honours

In April 2005, Charles O'Tudor was appointed a member of the Lagos State Health Advocacy Implementation Committee, "an initiative inaugurated to create necessary awareness on the availability of various free health care programmes and services put in place by the Lagos State government for public consumption."

O'Tudor's ADSTRAT was endorsed by the State's Commissioner of Health, Jide Idris, "to deliver on the promises of the Health Advocacy Implementation Committee." O'Tudor led a team of brand strategists that bid for and won Cross River State's pioneer 'Out of Home Media Project' which was recently passed into law by the State House of Assembly. In 2007, his ADSTRAT emerged as the "preferred marketing and branding company to market the 2008 edition of Zuma Film Festival.

In 2005, he entered the "Junior Chamber International Hall of All Time Fame of Exemplary Leaders", becoming the fourth individual to be so honoured in the history of the Nigerian chapter of the organization. The Brand Consultant of the Year Award, CITY People Magazine, is also among his numerous honours. He was appointed member of the Obudu Ranch International Mountain Race Marketing Committee and Chairman of its Sub Committee on Brand Strategy, Marketing and Advertising by the Governor of Cross-River State, Senator Liyel Imoke. He is a member, Board of Judges, The Future Awards; Member, Roundtable, the Wits Business School Alumni Association, University of Witwatersrand, Johannesburg, South Africa.

Personal life
O’Tudor is married with three children: Vanzale, Dorothy and Daniel. He changed his trademark look when he shaved his dreadlocks for which he had been known for decades.

References

Living people
1971 births
21st-century Nigerian businesspeople
University of Jos alumni